Dalmanutha or Dalmanoutha (δαλμανουθα) is the unknown destination of Jesus on the shores of the Sea of Gallilee after he fed the four thousand, as recorded in Mark's gospel. It is sometimes believed to be in the vicinity of Magdala, the alleged hometown of Mary Magdalene, since the parallel passage in Matthew's gospel, refers instead to "Magadan", which has been taken to be a variant form of "Magdala".

In 2013, Ken Dark reported finding a possible location of Dalmanutha in the Ginosar Plain, placing the finding place of the famous 2000-years-old fishing boat right on the stretch of lakeshore belonging to this now ruined ancient town.

That there was ever a town called Dalmanutha is disputed by biblical scholar Joel L. Watts. He maintains that "Dalmanutha" is a cue to Mark's readers regarding the battle around Magdala during the Jewish Revolt.

References

External links 
Harper's Bible Dictionary
Mark 8
Mathew 15
http://www.huffingtonpost.com/2013/09/17/dalmanutha-biblical-town-gospel-of-mark-sea-of-galilee_n_3940919.html
 http://dictionary.reference.com/browse/Dalmanutha
 https://web.archive.org/web/20081201232319/http://www1.bartleby.com/65/da/Dalmanut.html
 http://net.bible.org/dictionary.php?dict=dictionaries&word=Dalmanutha
 Photos Taken near Biblical Dalmanutha
 http://www.101bible.com/About/Dalmanutha.aspx

See also
Magdala, related historical location
Tarichaea, related historical location

New Testament places
Sea of Galilee